The Vítkovci were a Czech noble clan from southern Bohemia descended from Witiko of Prčice. The clan includes the House of Rosenberg.

References

Bohemian noble families
German noble families